Allaf is an Arabic surname. Notable people with the surname include:

Kareem Al Allaf (born 1998), Syrian tennis player
Mowaffak Allaf (1927–1996), Syrian diplomat

See also
 Allafi
 Allef

Arabic-language surnames